The Grammy Award for Best Jazz Vocal Album is an award presented at the Grammy Awards, a ceremony that was established in 1958 and originally called the Gramophone Awards, to recording artists for quality works (songs or albums) in the vocal jazz music genre. Awards in several categories are presented at the ceremony annually by the National Academy of Recording Arts and Sciences of the United States to "honor artistic achievement, technical proficiency and overall excellence in the recording industry, without regard to album sales or chart position".

History
Until 2001 this award was titled the Grammy Award for Best Jazz Vocal Performance.  From 1981 to 1991 (except for 1985) this category was presented as separate awards for Best Jazz Vocal Performance, Female and Best Jazz Vocal Performance, Male.

Years reflect the year in which the Grammy Awards were presented, for works released in the previous year.

Recipients

References

General
  Note: User must select the "Jazz" category as the genre under the search feature.

Specific

External links
Official site of the Grammy Awards

 
Vocal Album
 
Jazz Vocal Album
Album awards